The Park School is an independent day school in Brookline, Massachusetts, for boys and girls in Pre-Kindergarten through eighth grade. Founded in 1888 as Miss Pierce's School, it is a 34-acre campus in Brookline, Massachusetts near Jamaica Pond.

History 
Park's roots goes back to 1888, when Miss Caroline Pierce began a proprietary school on Walnut Street in Brookline. In 1923, it was incorporated and named to commemorate Julia Park, principal from 1910-1922. A gift of land from Dr. and Mrs. James M. Faulkner, former Park parents and grandparents, provided an opportunity for the School to move in 1971 from Kennard Road in Brookline to a 34-acre, country-like setting near Jamaica Pond and opposite Larz Anderson Park. (provided from school website). 

Park's facilities span a 34-acre campus.

Park's library contains 30,000 volumes and audiovisual materials.

Across the campus at 255 Goddard Avenue is Faulkner House, which provides office space and PreKindergarten classes.

Construction

The school's main building was constructed in 1971 from a modern architectural design by Earl Flansburgh & Associates under the direction of then Headmaster Robert S. Hurlbut Jr. Built of reinforced precast concrete as a stack of modular classroom and office spaces with wall-length windows for more natural illumination of rooms, it exemplifies the brutalist concrete construction style pioneered by Swiss architect Le Corbusier. But its brick wall accents and its preserved oaks and Roxbury puddingstone outcroppings pay homage to historical New England building traditions and topography. The building features an inner courtyard with a "Space Churn" stainless steel mobile sculpture by George Rickey, donated by a Park parent in 1971. In 1996, the West Building designed by Graham Gund and Associates, added two full-sized basketball courts, three modern science labs, and four classrooms to the school's facilities. In 2008, the school completed a major expansion and renovation of all of the Pre-kindergarten – grade 5 classrooms. A new wing houses Grade 4 & 5 classrooms, after-school program space, a conference room, and adjoins the newly renovated 5,400-square foot library.

During the summer of 2018, several renovation projects took place including significant updates to the Early Childhood classrooms (PreK & K), the accompanying Early Childhood/Discovery Playground, and the transformation of a Conference Room into a state-of-the-art Makerspace.

In the fall of 2021, Park students returned to a transformed Upper Division learning environment. Summer construction focused on the dated and unrenovated classrooms on the fourth floor of the Main Building and an unused former locker room area on the first floor. Eleven new, expanded Upper Division classrooms and dedicated collaboration spaces are deepening student engagement, giving our teachers instructional flexibility, and fostering meaningful collaboration among students and adults.

Program

The Park School is composed of two Divisions - Lower Division (PreK - Grade 4) and Upper Division (Grades 5-8)

Schedule
At Park, the academic year runs from September to June. School begins at 8:15 a.m. School is dismissed at 3:05 p.m. PreK and Kindergarten are dismissed at 12 p.m. on Friday.

Extracurricular activities
Various extracurricular activities are offered in the After-School Program for PreK – Grade 5. Families may sign up for two to five afternoons per week; pick-up times are 3:05 p.m., 4:30 p.m. or 6 p.m.

Students in Grades 6 – 8 are encouraged to participate in elective sports or after-school drama. In addition, clubs and a quiet study hall are offered until 4:30 p.m. Park offers three seasons of sports, as well as three seasons of theater production, that students may participate in.

Sports include Flag Football, Soccer, Field Hockey, Volleyball and Cross Country in the fall, Basketball, Wrestling and Ice Hockey in the winter, and Lacrosse, Softball and Track and Field in the spring.

Theater choices change term to term and include both modern and classical theater, with a musical in the winter term.

Annual events
School-wide events include Grandparents' & Special Friends' Day; Yule Festival – a longstanding holiday assembly that acknowledges both the common and varying traditions of the school's diverse community in songs and readings that capture the principles and spirit of Hanukkah, Christmas, and Kwanzaa; and May Day – a special assembly welcoming spring for students in Pre-K through Grade 8. Graduation is held in June and features an alumnus/a speaker.

Notable alumni
Notable graduates of The Park School include:

Ty Burr: film critic, The Boston Globe
Bertha Coombs: reporter, CNBC
Michael Cox: professional football player
Evan Dando: lead singer, The Lemonheads
Loren Galler-Rabinowitz: Miss Massachusetts 2011
Tucker Halpern: Grammy Nominated musician Sofi Tukker
Joseph Kahn: editor, New York Times
Jonathan Kraft: President, New England Patriots
Elliot Richardson: U.S. Attorney General
George Schuller: jazz drummer, son of composer/conductor Gunther Schuller
Chris Tierney: professional soccer player, New England Revolution
Jonathan Tucker: actor
David Walton: actor
W. Kamau Bell: comedian 
Stu McNay: athlete, Olympic sailor

References

External links
The Park School

Private elementary schools in Massachusetts
Private middle schools in Massachusetts
Educational institutions established in 1888
Schools in Norfolk County, Massachusetts
1888 establishments in Massachusetts